Shahrak-e Dariashahr (also Romanized as Shahrak-e Darīāshahr) is a village in Mian Band Rural District, in the Central District of Nur County, Mazandaran Province, Iran. At the 2006 census, its population was 21, in 8 families.

References 

Populated places in Nur County